Harald Wapenaar (born 10 April 1970) is a Dutch former professional footballer who played as a goalkeeper. As well as playing in his native Netherlands, he also played league football in Italy and England.

Career
Wapenaar played for Italian club Udinese and FC Utrecht before transferring to Portsmouth in the summer of 2003. Portsmouth signed Wapenaar as competition for first-choice goalkeeper Shaka Hislop. However, Hislop's superb form and the emergence of young goalkeeper Jamie Ashdown meant Wapenaar struggled for games prior to his move back to the Netherlands, to Vitesse Arnhem in January 2005. After losing his place in 2006–07, he signed for Sparta Rotterdam on loan in 2007, starting in their Eredivisie match against Excelsior Rotterdam on 21 January .

Between 2010 and 2015, Wapenaar worked as goalkeepers coach for FC Volendam. He held the same position during the 2015–16 season at Lierse. He was appointed goalkeepers coach at Willem II in July 2016. On January 6, 2022, Wapenaar left the Tilburg club with immediate effect because of 'insurmountable difference of opinion about vision and working method'.

Career statistics

Honours
Utrecht
KNVB Cup: 2002–03

References

External links

 Career stats – Voetbal International 

1970 births
Living people
People from Vlaardingen
Expatriate footballers in England
Expatriate footballers in Italy
Dutch expatriate footballers
Dutch footballers
Association football goalkeepers
RBC Roosendaal players
Helmond Sport players
FC Utrecht players
Udinese Calcio players
Portsmouth F.C. players
SBV Vitesse players
Sparta Rotterdam players
Eredivisie players
Premier League players
Serie A players
FC Volendam non-playing staff
Willem II (football club) non-playing staff
Dutch expatriate sportspeople in Italy
Dutch expatriate sportspeople in England
Footballers from South Holland